Euglandina candida is a species of predatory air-breathing land snail, a terrestrial pulmonate gastropod mollusk in the family Spiraxidae.

Subspecies 
 Euglandina candida conularis (Pfeiffer, 1855)

References

Spiraxidae
Gastropods described in 1852